The 2023–24 Sport Lisboa e Benfica season will be the club's 120th season in existence and its 90th consecutive season in the top flight of Portuguese football. Domestically, Benfica will play in the Primeira Liga, Taça de Portugal and Taça da Liga.

Players

First-team squad

Transfers

In

Out

Pre-season and friendlies

Competitions

Overall record

Primeira Liga

League table

Results summary

Results by round

Matches

Taça de Portugal

Taça da Liga

Group stage

References

S.L. Benfica seasons
Benfica